Rothwell may refer to:

Places

Australia 

Rothwell, Queensland, Australia

Canada 

Rothwell, New Brunswick, Canada

United Kingdom 

Rothwell, Lincolnshire, United Kingdom
Rothwell, Northamptonshire, United Kingdom
Rothwell, West Yorkshire, United Kingdom
Rothwell (ward)

People with the surname
Annie Rothwell (1837–1927), Canadian novelist and poet
Ben Rothwell (born 1981), American professional mixed martial arts fighter
Ben Rothwell (boxer) (1902–1979), American boxer
Caroline Rothwell (born 1967), English-Australian sculptor
Charlotte Rothwell, British actress
Edward Rothwell (c. 1844–1892), English-born Newfoundland merchant and politician
Evelyn Rothwell (1911–2008) (Lady Barbirolli), oboist; wife of Sir John Barbirolli, orchestral conductor
Frank Rothwell (born 1936), Irish weightlifter
Geoff Rothwell (1920–2017), British bomber pilot
Harry Rothwell, former Canadian football player
Herbert Rothwell (born 1880), English footballer
Jarred Rothwell, South African Muay Thai boxer
Jerry Rothwell, British filmmaker
Joe Rothwell (born 1995), English professional footballer
Michael Rothwell (actor) (1936–2009), British actor
Michael Rothwell (sailor) (born 1953), American sailor
Naomi D. Rothwell (1917–2000), American statistician and halfway house director
 Dame Nancy Rothwell (born 1955), British scientist and vice-chancellor of the University of Manchester
Nicolas Rothwell, Australian journalist and author
Peter Rothwell (1920–2010), English WWII pilot
Richard Pennefather Rothwell (1836–1901), Canadian-American civil, mechanical and mining engineer
Richard Rothwell (painter) (1800–1868), Irish portrait and genre painter
Sir Richard Rothwell, 1st Baronet (c. 1628–1694), English Member of Parliament
Walter Henry Rothwell (1872–1927), English conductor
Talbot Rothwell (1916–1981), English screenwriter
William J. Rothwell (born 1951), American workplace researcher

See also
Rothwell, Hick and Rothwell, early 19th-century English engineering company
Ruthwell, Dumfries and Galloway, Scotland